Barugh is a village in the metropolitan borough of Barnsley in South Yorkshire, England. The village falls within the Barnsley Metropolitan ward of Darton West.

See also
Listed buildings in Darton

External links 

Geography of Barnsley
Villages in South Yorkshire